Kryptonite is a fictional material that appears primarily in Superman stories published by DC Comics. In its best-known form, it is a green, crystalline material originating from Superman's home world of Krypton that emits a unique, poisonous radiation that can weaken and even kill Kryptonians. Kryptonite radiation can emit through any element except lead. Thus, Superman has a special lead suit to protect himself from the radiation. There are other varieties of kryptonite, such as red and gold kryptonite, which have different but still generally negative effects. Due to Superman's popularity, kryptonite has become a byword for an extraordinary exploitable weakness, synonymous with "Achilles' heel". Batman, Lex Luthor, Metallo, and Titano are four notable characters often presented as using kryptonite — the first carrying the substance as a last-ditch method to stop his ally Superman if he is subject to mind control or otherwise compromised, the next two using the mineral to ward off Superman or incorporating it into weapons, and the fourth being able to project rays of kryptonite radiation from his eyes after being altered by simultaneous exposure to kryptonite and uranium.

History

An unpublished 1940 story titled "The K-Metal from Krypton", written by Superman creator Jerry Siegel, featured a prototype of kryptonite. It was a mineral from the planet Krypton that drained Superman of his strength while giving superhuman powers to humans. This story was rejected because in it Superman reveals his identity to Lois Lane.

The mineral known as kryptonite, not to be confused with the real element krypton, was first officially introduced in the radio serial The Adventures of Superman, in the story "The Meteor from Krypton", broadcast in June 1943. An apocryphal story claims that kryptonite was introduced to give Superman's voice actor, Bud Collyer, the possibility to take a vacation at a time when the radio serial was performed live. In an episode where Collyer would not be present to perform, Superman would be incapacitated by kryptonite, and a substitute voice actor would make groaning sounds. This tale was recounted by Julius Schwartz in his memoir. However, the historian Michael J. Hayde disputes this: in "The Meteor From Krypton", Superman is never exposed to kryptonite. If kryptonite allowed Collyer to take vacations, that was a fringe benefit discovered later. More likely, kryptonite was introduced as a plot device for Superman to discover his origin.

In the radio serial, Krypton was located in the same solar system as Earth, in the same orbit, but on the opposite side of the Sun.  This provided an easy explanation for how kryptonite found its way to Earth. During the comics' Silver Age, which put Krypton in another solar system light-years away, much of the kryptonite that came to Earth (along with several Kryptonian artifacts) was explained as having come through the same "space warp" that baby Kal-El's rocket traversed.

Kryptonite was incorporated into the comic mythos with Superman #61 (November 1949). Editor Dorothy Woolfolk stated in an interview with Florida Today in August 1993 that she "felt Superman's invulnerability was boring."

The only substance in the universe that kryptonite radiation (from any variety) cannot penetrate is lead.

Long said to be an element in the Golden, Silver, and Bronze Age comics, Kryptonite became a compound after Crisis as revealed in Action Comics #591.

Forms, colors and effects 
Various forms of the fictional material have been created over the years in Superman publications and programs.

In other media

Television

Live action
 The Adventures of Superman (1952–1958) featured kryptonite in the episodes "Panic in the Sky", "The Defeat of Superman", "Superman Week", "The Deadly Rock", "The Magic Secret", "The Gentle Monster" and "All That Glitters".
Superboy (1988–1992) featured green kryptonite in the episodes "Kryptonite Kills" and "Metallo", "Bride of Bizarro", "Kryptonite Kid", and "Obituary for a Super-Hero". The red variety was featured in the episode "Super Menace". A Bizarro white variant was featured in the episode "The Battle with Bizarro", which heals the title character.
Lois & Clark: The New Adventures of Superman (1993–1997) featured green kryptonite in the episodes "The Green, Green Glow of Home", "Barbarians at the Planet", "The House of Luthor", "Metallo", "Top Copy", "Tempus Fugitive" and "Battleground Earth". The red variety was featured in the episodes "Individual Responsibility", "Ultrawoman" and "Lethal Weapon".
 Smallville (2001–2011) featured kryptonite on a regular basis. A large quantity of the green variety descends to Earth in a meteor shower, arriving in the town of Smallville, Kansas with the spaceship containing the infant Kal-El. The material is colloquially referred to by Smallville residents as "meteor rock", but is eventually called "kryptonite" by Clark Kent once he discovers his origins in season two episode "Visitor" (in real life, the area near Brenham, Kansas is known as the site of a major meteorite strike between 10,000 and 20,000 years ago). Aside from being harmful to Clark Kent, the mineral produces bizarre changes in flora and fauna. It also occasionally bestows metahuman abilities on humans depending on the circumstances of their exposure to it, such as a girl treated for a rare bone disease acquiring shapeshifting powers. These people are commonly known by the inhabitants of Smallville as "Meteor Freaks". The green variety of the mineral appears in several episodes every season, although other varieties appear, including: red in "Red" (2002), "Exodus", "Exile", "Phoenix" (2003), "Unsafe" (2005), "Crimson" (2007) and "Upgrade" (2010); black, formed when superheating green kryptonite in "Crusade" (2004) and "Doomsday" (2009); silver in "Splinter" made by Milton Fine (2005); blue in "Blue" (2007), "Persona" (2008), "Kandor" (2009), "Salvation" (2010) and  "Harvest" (2011); as a gem in "Persuasion" (2010) and gold (introduced in Earth Two) in "Luthor", "Prophecy" and "Finale" (2011). Smallville was the first appearance of a black kryptonite that would split a person into their good and evil sides, before later being brought into the comic book canon in Supergirl (vol. 5) #2 (Oct. 2005).
 Kryptonite has made several appearances in the Arrowverse:
 Supergirl (2015–2021) features green kryptonite in the episodes "Pilot", "Stronger Together", "Hostile Takeover", "For the Girl Who Has Everything", "Distant Sun" and "Immortal Kombat". The DEO manages to synthesize and create blue kryptonite which is featured in the episode "Bizarro". Red kryptonite is featured in the episode "Falling" as a failed attempt to recreate green kryptonite by Maxwell Lord. Silver kryptonite is featured in the episode "Nevertheless, She Persisted". In season 3, the black kryptonite is pivotal to its arc, first appearing in the episode "The Fanatical", in which it is being referred to as Harun-El by Kryptonians. The Worldkiller Coven from Krypton, headed by dark priestess Selena, schemes to use the Harun-El to terraform Earth into a Krypton-like planet for Kryptonians to inhabit. The protagonists uses the Harun-El to split the Worldkiller Coven's servant, Reign, from her human alter-ego Samantha Arias. By the end of the season finale, it is revealed that Supergirl's being is also divided after her exposure to it during her final battle with Reign. In season 4, Lena Luthor develops a serum derived from Harun-El, and Lex Luthor, Agent Liberty and James Olsen develop metahuman abilities after being injected with it such as enhanced speed, durability, strength, and a healing factor.
 Green kryptonite appears briefly in the crossover event "Crisis on Earth-X". During a confrontation with Overgirl, Supergirl's Earth-X counterpart, Oliver Queen fires an arrow at her containing a kryptonite arrowhead, impaling Overgirl's shoulder. An astonished Supergirl asks Oliver why he has a kryptonite arrow, to which Oliver replies: "In case an evil you ever showed up!"
 Kryptonite also appears in the "Crisis on Infinite Earths" crossover event: In Part Two, the Bruce Wayne of Earth-99 keeps kryptonite in the Batcave and had used it to kill his Earth's Superman. He uses it on Supergirl, but is killed by Earth-1's Kate Kane before he can kill her. Kate then collects the kryptonite in his possession. In Part Three, Batwoman intended to use the kryptonite on Supergirl to stop a dangerous plan of hers, but instead reveals it to her as an act of faith. Supergirl tells her to keep it, saying that she "[has] the courage" that Kate will never have to use it.
 In the Batwoman episode "A Secret Kept From All the Rest", Lucius Fox states in his journal that green kryptonite is the only thing capable of penetrating the Batsuit. In the season 1 finale episode "O, Mouse!", as Alice tries to locate kryptonite, Luke finds it and manages to destroy it. But Kate reveals to both of them that she has another kryptonite rock given to her from Crisis. The bullet was later used by Hush on Ryan Wilder when she became Batwoman. This caused her pain until she was treated when the plant she owned turned out to be a Desert Rose from Coryana.
 In Superman & Lois, Superman is targeted by "The Stranger", who uses green kryptonite against him in their initial fight. Meanwhile, Morgan Edge unearths a large batch of X-kryptonite from a Smallville mine, which has made the local population susceptible for the Eradicator, a device which Edge uses to implant Kryptonian consciousnesses into humans. Eventually it is revealed that the Stranger is John Henry Irons from an alternate Earth where Superman led a superpowered army to attack Metropolis as he makes it his mission to defeat the Earth-Prime Superman and thwart Edge's experiments before the same thing can happen again. In season 2, some people have been trafficking X-Kryptonite until it was stopped by Lois Lane, Sam Lane, and Jordan Kent. Natalie Irons even used some of the X-Kryptonite she obtained to make a lacquer to coat her version of her dad's exo-suit.

Animation
 The Brady Kids (1972–1973) featured green kryptonite in the episode "Cindy's Super Friend" which shows Clark Kent attempting to become Superman in the Kids' clubhouse, only to be incapacitated by a piece of green kryptonite used as part of a rock collection. 
 Super Friends (1973–1986) features kryptonite in the episodes "Super Friends: Rest in Peace" ("Krypton steel"); "Darkseid's Golden Trap" (gold); "Terror from the Phantom Zone" (blue, green, and red); "Return of the Phantoms" (green); "Rokan: Enemy from Space" (green); "Bazarowurld" (red and blue); "Revenge of Bizarro" (red and blue); Will the World Collide?" (green); "Uncle Mxyzptlk" (red); "The Death of Superman" (green); "Batman: Dead or Alive" (green).
 Superman (1988) features a kryptonite ring worn by Lex Luthor. On the episode "The Hunter", Superman's enemy transforms his body into kryptonite.
 Superman: The Animated Series (1996–2000) offers an explanation of the effect of the material on Superman. This series and The New Batman Adventures (1997–1999) showcase a three-part crossover story arc called "World's Finest" that demonstrates the effect of kryptonite poisoning on humans. 
 Justice League (2001–2004) explores the same theme where Lex Luthor develops cancer from his long term exposure to a piece of kryptonite he kept with him without taking precautions to contain it.
 In Batman Beyond (1999–2001) the two-part episode "The Call" reveals that kryptonite has been kept safe in the distant future as a deterrent against Superman due to the hero's past as a rogue agent under Darkseid's mind manipulation.
 Krypto the Superdog (2005–2006) features green, red and a purple-spotted variation.
 Legion of Super Heroes (2006–2008) features green kryptonite.
 Young Justice (2010–present) features green kryptonite in the episodes "Auld Acquaintance", "Involuntary", "Encounter Upon the Razor's Edge!", "Forbidden Secrets of Civilizations Past!", "Zenith and Abyss", "Over and Out" and "Death and Rebirth".
 In The Batman (2007-2008), episode "The Batman/Superman Story", Metallo was hired by Lex Luthor, using green kryptonite to finish off Superman, before being defeated by Batman and Robin. Batman keeps the green kryptonite for emergencies. In final episode, "Lost Heroes, Part Two", green kryptonite is used by Superman against a android of The Joining, who obtained his powers.
 In Batman: The Brave and the Bold episode "Battle of the Superheroes!" (2011), Superman is infected with a red kryptonite necklace secretly given to Lois Lane by Lex Luthor, which causes him to become evil. Now Batman must work with Krypto the Superdog to hold off Superman until the kryptonite's effects wear off.
 In Lego DC Super Hero Girls (2016-2018), Lena Luthor developed a series of kryptonites with one of six different colors each, which effect everyone that comes near them by changing their emotions, such as anger, sadness, fear, distrust and forgetfulness, while the green ones only act as normal kryptonite that only affects Supergirl. She is usually seen assisting the Female Furies and Eclipso, though the latter of which Lena always hinders her plans in the end, hindering her own plans in the process.
 Kryptonite appears in the Justice League Action short episode "True Colors" (2017), used by Metallo against Superman. Firestorm arrives and attempts to neutralize the kryptonite's effects by changing it into lead, but is initially unsuccessful and changes it into various other colors (red, gold, black, and pink) before finally succeeding.
 In DC Super Hero Girls (2019-present), green kryptonite has been used by Catwoman to weaken Supergirl and by Lex Luthor to trap both Superman and Supergirl in capsules, while Ra's al Ghul once used red kryptonite to mind control Supergirl into destroying a boy band concert. The episode "#DoubleDanvers" features periwinkle kryptonite, which makes Kryptonians giddy (and makes Bizarros go into a rage).

Films
 In Superman (1978) Lex Luthor (Gene Hackman) deduces that a meteorite found in Addis Ababa is actually a radioactive piece of the exploded planet Krypton. Luthor uses the mineral to weaken Superman (Christopher Reeve), who is saved by Luthor's lover Eve Teschmacher (Valerie Perrine).
 In Superman III (1983) billionaire Ross Webster (Robert Vaughn) orders the creation of synthetic green kryptonite. Computer programmer Gus Gorman (Richard Pryor) uses tar to compensate for an unknown component of kryptonite, causing the newly created mineral to eventually turn Superman evil and split the hero into two beings (making its effects more in line with red and black kryptonite). Gorman's "supercomputer" later fights Superman and uses a kryptonite ray.
 In Superman Returns (2006) Lex Luthor (Kevin Spacey) steals the Addis Ababa L9 Pallasite meteorite and uses kryptonite to create a new Kryptonian landmass and a shard for use against Superman. The film describes kryptonite's formula as "sodium lithium boron silicate hydroxide with fluorine". A year after the film was released, a substance with a similar formula was discovered, jadarite, a coincidence which led to media attention. The new mineral, unlike the fictional material in the movie, does not contain fluorine and does not have a green glow, an effect normally associated with nuclear radiation in both real life and popular culture.
 In Justice League: The New Frontier (2008), Batman mentions he keeps some kryptonite in case he needs to fight Superman.
 In Justice League: Crisis on Two Earths (2010) an alternate universe version of Lex Luthor uses blue kryptonite against the villain Ultraman.
 In Justice League: Doom (2012), the villain Metallo wounds Superman with a kryptonite bullet, but he is saved by the JLA.
 In Batman v Superman: Dawn of Justice (2016), green kryptonite is discovered by men working for Lex Luthor (Jesse Eisenberg) at the bottom of the Indian Ocean (after Superman's battle with the World Engine in Man of Steel) and experimented with by Luthor, who learns of its harmful effect on Kryptonians when the corpse of General Zod is exposed to it. The kryptonite is then stolen from Luthor by Batman (Ben Affleck), who uses it to create kryptonite gas pellets and a kryptonite-tipped spear, both of which he later uses in battle with Superman (Henry Cavill). Doomsday is also shown to be weakened by kryptonite, allowing Superman to use the spear to kill him in the film's climax.
 In DC League of Super-Pets, Lex Luthor brings an orange kryptonite meteor to Earth, hoping to use it to give himself superpowers. He fails, but a shard of the meteor lands in an Animal shelter, granting powers to the pets there. One of these pets, a former Lexcorp Guinea pig named Lulu, decides to use her newfound powers to conquer the world. Lulu also uses pieces of green kryptonite against Superman and Krypto, and flashbacks show her being exposed to red kryptonite (which makes her fur fall out) and purple kryptonite (which gives her terrible nightmares).

Video games
 In Superman: Atari 2600 (1978) Luthor has created kryptonite satellites and scattered them around Metropolis that take away Superman's ability to fly when touched. Superman must then walk around Metropolis until he finds and meets Lois Lane to regain his powers.
 In the 1988 Kemco Superman game for the Nintendo Entertainment System, defeating random enemies may cause red or green Kryptonite to appear, which must be avoided or else it will damage the player's health. A blue crystal restores the player's health, explained in the manual as Kryptonian power crystals akin to the 1978 film.
 Superman 64 (1999) it appears as kryptonite fog, coined as an excuse for the game's poor draw distance.
 In the crossover fighting game Mortal Kombat vs DC Universe (2008) kryptonite weakens Superman when exposed, while it makes his Mortal Kombat universe counterpart, the thunder god Raiden, stronger.
 In Lego Batman 2: DC Super Heroes (2012) kryptonite is used to power Lex Luthor's weapon, the "Deconstructor".
 Kryptonite appears in Scribblenauts Unmasked: A DC Comics Adventure (2013).
 Kryptonite is one of the foundation elements in Lego Dimensions.
 Injustice: Gods Among Us (2013) features a kryptonite laser designed as a fail-safe against Superman should he turn against humanity.
 Gold and green kryptonite appear in the story mode of Injustice 2.

Serials
Columbia Pictures produced two 15-part motion picture serials that used kryptonite as a plot device: Superman (1948) and Atom Man vs. Superman (1950).

Music
Songs:
 "Kryptonite" by 3 Doors Down (2000).
 "Party Up (Up in Here)" by DMX (2000).
 "Kryptonite (I'm on It)" by rap group Purple Ribbon All-Stars (2006).
 "Kryptonite" By Mario ft. Rich Boy from his third studio album Go
 "Fashion Is My Kryptonite" by Bella Thorne and Zendaya (2012).
 "Ready or Not" by Bridgit Mendler (2012).
 "Shut Up and Dance" by Walk the Moon (2014).
 "Get Your Cape On" by Jordyn Kane (2015).
 Pocket Full of Kryptonite, a 1991 album by Spin Doctors. The album's title is drawn from a line in the song "Jimmy Olsen's Blues", which is featured on the album.
 In the title track for his album Ten Feet Tall and Bulletproof, Travis Tritt sings about picking a fight when he feels like Superman "only to find my opponent is holding kryptonite".
 The 2000 song, "Superman (It's Not Easy)" by "Five for Fighting" mentions kryptonite: "...digging for kryptonite on this one way street.".
 The Genesis song "The Carpet Crawlers" mentions kryptonite: "Mild-mannered Supermen are held in kryptonite...".
 "There's a Moon in the Sky" by The B-52's mentions kryptonite: "you get a mouth, a mouthful of red kryptonite".
 "Jam on It" by Newcleus features a "battle" between the band and Superman, and they "rock his butt with a 12-inch cut called disco kryptonite."
 "One Thing" by One Direction mentions kryptonite: "you're my kryptonite"
 "Pineapple Kryptonite" by ATARASHII GAKKO!
 "Kryptonita", a 1991 album by Miguel Mateos.

See also
Trinitite

References

External links

 The Superman Homepage's section on kryptonite
 Howstuffworks.com: "How Kryptonite Works"

1943 in comics
Superman
Vulnerability
Fictional elements introduced in 1943